Stabilin-1 is a protein that in humans is encoded by the STAB1 gene.

This gene encodes a large, transmembrane receptor protein which may function in angiogenesis, lymphocyte homing, cell adhesion, or receptor scavenging. The protein contains 7 fasciclin, 16 epidermal growth factor (EGF)-like, and 2 laminin-type EGF-like domains as well as a C-type lectin-like hyaluronan-binding Link module. The protein is primarily expressed on sinusoidal endothelial cells of liver, spleen, and lymph node. The receptor has been shown to endocytose ligands such as low density lipoprotein, Gram-positive and Gram-negative bacteria, and advanced glycosylation end products. Supporting its possible role as a scavenger receptor, the protein rapidly cycles between the plasma membrane and early endosomes. STAB1 is also known to interact with the protein chitinase domain-containing protein 1.

References

Further reading